|}

The Greatwood Gold Cup is a Premier Handicap National Hunt steeplechase in Great Britain which is open to horses aged five years or older. It is run at Newbury over a distance of about 2 miles and 4 furlongs (2 miles 3 furlongs and 187 yards, or ), and during its running there are sixteen fences to be jumped. It is a handicap race, and it is scheduled to take place each year in late February or early March.

The event was introduced in 2004, and for its first three runnings it was sponsored by Vodafone. Since then it has had several different sponsors, and for each of these its title changed accordingly. The race was promoted to Grade 3 level in 2007, and it was given its present name in 2010. It is now sponsored by BetVictor on behalf of Greatwood, a charity for the welfare of retired racehorses. The race was reclassified as a Premier Handicap from the 2023 running when Grade 3 status was renamed by the British Horseracing Authority.

Records
Leading jockey (3 wins):
 Nick Scholfield – Natal (2008), New Little Bric (2009), San Benedeto (2019) 

Leading trainer (9 wins):
 Paul Nicholls – Cornish Sett  (2006), Natal (2008), New Little Bric (2009), Big Fella Thanks (2010), Aerial (2012), Pacha Du Polder (2013), Sound Investment (2015), Sametegal (2016), San Benedeto (2019)

Winners
 Weights given in stones and pounds

See also
 Horse racing in Great Britain
 List of British National Hunt races

References

 Racing Post:

National Hunt races in Great Britain
Newbury Racecourse
National Hunt chases
Recurring sporting events established in 2004
2004 establishments in England